The Stanford Legacy is a totem pole by artist Don Yeomans, installed on the Stanford University campus in Stanford, California, United States. The ,  artwork was installed outside the law school on May 6, 2002. It exhibits a traditional Haida style and was carved from an approximately 400-year-old Western red cedar. The totem was cleaned and repainted in 2013.

References

External links
 

Outdoor sculptures in California
Stanford University buildings and structures
Totem poles in the United States